An environmental management system (EMS) is "a system which integrates policy, procedures and processes for training of personnel, monitoring, summarizing, and reporting of specialized environmental performance information to internal and external stakeholders of a firm".

The most widely used standard on which an EMS is based is International Organization for Standardization (ISO) 14001. Alternatives include the EMAS.

Goals
The goals of EMS are to increase compliance and reduce waste:

Compliance is the act of reaching and maintaining minimal legal standards. By not being compliant, companies may face fines, government intervention or may not be able to operate.
Waste reduction goes beyond compliance to reduce environmental impact. The EMS helps to develop, implement, manage, coordinate and monitor environmental policies. Waste reduction begins at the design phase through pollution prevention and waste minimization. Waste can be limited by ‘reduce, reuse & recycle’
Reduce resource usage
Reduce pollution

Features 
An environmental management system (EMS):

 Serves as a tool, or process, to improve environmental performance and information mainly "design, pollution control and waste minimization, training, reporting to top management, and the setting of goals"
 Provides a systematic way of managing an organization's environmental affairs
 Is the aspect of the organization's overall management structure that addresses immediate and long-term impacts of its products, services and processes on the environment. EMS assists with planning, controlling and monitoring policies in an organization.
 Gives order and consistency for organizations to address environmental concerns through the allocation of resources, assignment of responsibility and ongoing evaluation of practices, procedures and processes
 Creates environmental buy-in from management and employees and assigns accountability and responsibility.
 Sets framework for training to achieve objectives and desired performance.
 Helps understand legislative requirements to better determine a product or service's impact, significance, priorities and objectives.
 Focuses on continual improvement of the system and a way to implement policies and objectives to meet a desired result. This also helps with reviewing and auditing the EMS to find future opportunities.
 Encourages contractors and suppliers to establish their own EMS.
 Facilitates e-reporting to federal, state and provincial government environmental agencies through direct upload.

EMS Model

An EMS follows a Plan-Do-Check-Act, or PDCA, Cycle. The diagram shows the process of first developing an environmental policy, planning the EMS, and then implementing it. The process also includes checking the system and acting on it. The model is continuous because an EMS is a process of continual improvement in which an organization is constantly reviewing and revising the system.

This is a model that can be used by a wide range of organizations – from manufacturing facilities to service industries to government agencies.

==Accreditation== 

Environmental Management Systems can be accredited under ISO14001

Other meanings

An EMS can also be classified as: 
a system which monitors, tracks and reports emissions information, particularly with respect to the oil and gas industry. EMSs are becoming web-based in response to the EPA's mandated greenhouse gas (GHG) reporting rule, which allows for reporting GHG emissions information via the internet.
a centrally controlled and often automated network of devices (now frequently wireless using z-wave and zigbee technologies) used to control the internal environment of a building. Such a system namely acts as an interface between end user and energy (gas/electricity) consumption.

See also
 Eco-Management and Audit Scheme
 Environmental resource management
 Industrial ecology
 ISO 14000
 Life-cycle assessment

References

Literature

Boiral, O 2007, 'Corporate Greening Through IS0 14001: A Rational Myth?', Organisation Science, vol. 18, no. 1, pp. 127–146.

Clements, R.B 1996, Complete Guide to ISO 14000, Prentice Hall, Upper Saddle River.
Florida, R., & Davison, D. (2001). Gaining from green management: Environmental management systems inside and outside the factory. California Management Review, 43 (3), 64-85.

Sroufe, Robert. "Effects of Environmental Management Systems on Environmental Management Practices and Operations." Production and Operations Management. 12-3 (2003): 416–431.

External links
 ISO 14000 essentials

Economy and the environment
Sustainability and environmental management